This is a list of prisoners of Arkivet, a political prison and Gestapo Headquarters which was operated in Nazi-occupied Norway.

A cross symbol next to a name denotes that the person died during World War II, at Arkivet or elsewhere.

See also
List of Berg prisoners
List of Grini prisoners

References

Arkivet
Arkivet
Arkivet